It Takes Two is a 1995 American romantic comedy film starring Kirstie Alley, Steve Guttenberg, and Mary-Kate and Ashley Olsen. The title is taken from the song of the same name by Marvin Gaye and Kim Weston, which is played in the closing credits. The storyline is similar to the 1881 novel, The Prince and the Pauper by Mark Twain, which in turn helped inspire the 1949 book Lisa and Lottie by Erich Kästner. The film was distributed by Warner Bros. through their Warner Bros. Family Entertainment label.

Plot 
Amanda Lemmon is a nine-year-old orphan who is being sought after by the Butkises, a reclusive, secretive family known to "collect" kids via adoption. She actually wants the likeable warm-hearted Diane Barrows, her social worker, to adopt her instead. Diane would like to do so, but authorities will not let her because of her low salary, unmarried status, and social worker position. While at summer camp, Amanda meets a rich girl named Alyssa Callaway, who looks just like Amanda. She's just come home from boarding school, only to find that her billionaire father and the camp's owner, Roger, is about to marry Clarice Kensington, an overbearing, self-centered, gold-digging socialite.

Amanda and Alyssa soon become acquainted, each longing for the other's life and decide to switch places. While Amanda adapts to Alyssa's wealthy lifestyle and Alyssa gets to experience summer camp, they get to know the other's parental figure and discover that Roger and Diane would be perfect for each other. Desperate to set them up, they arrange many meetings between them, hoping that they'll fall in love.

Roger and Diane do seem to hit it off upon meeting, as she is pleasantly surprised with his kind and humble nature despite his wealth, and he, with her help, is able to work up the courage to visit the camp again, which he has not done since his first wife (and Alyssa's mother) died, due to painful memories of her untimely death.

Upon having spied Roger and Diane laughing and swimming together in the lake one afternoon, Clarice manipulates Roger into moving the wedding up from the next month to the next day and Amanda, while posing as Alyssa, finds out that she plans on sending her off to boarding school in Tibet afterward. Alyssa ends up being adopted by the Butkises without Diane's knowledge while posing as Amanda.

Roughly two hours before the wedding, Amanda proves to the family butler, Vincenzo, that she is not Alyssa. He visits Diane at the orphanage and tells her about the switch. Diane arrives at the Butkises’ residence via helicopter to pick up the real Alyssa and get her to the wedding. Diane discovers the only reason the Butkises had adopted so many kids was to put them to work in their salvage yard as slave laborers. Furious, Diane reclaims Alyssa (disguised as Amanda) and threatens to report the Butkises to social services, giving their other adopted children hope for salvation.

Vincenzo and Amanda try their best to stall the wedding. As Roger hesitates to say "I do," he recalls all the good times he had with Diane and realizes that he has fallen in love with her, and he therefore cannot marry Clarice. All of a sudden, Diane bursts into the church with Alyssa behind her. At that moment, Roger confesses his love for Diane to Clarice, who furiously slaps him. She tries to do the same to "Alyssa", blaming her for sabotaging their wedding, but is stopped by Vincenzo. As she storms down the aisle, the real Alyssa steps out from behind Diane, and Clarice claims that there is a "conspiracy", thinking that there are two Alyssas. She tries to slap the real Alyssa, but Diane steps forward in time, barking at her, "Back off, Barbie", and calmly informs her that she has something in her teeth. Humiliated, Clarice moves to storm out of the church again, but Alyssa deliberately steps on her wedding gown, causing the skirt to rip off and exposing her white underwear to the whole church.

An incredulous Roger learns that Alyssa has been with Diane, while he had Amanda, all this time and it becomes apparent to them that the girls had orchestrated their meetups all along, about which they are extremely smug. After some encouragement from them, Roger and Diane share a kiss, and the four of them board a horse-drawn carriage, driven by Vincenzo, to take a ride through Central Park.

Cast
 Diane Barrows (Kirstie Alley) is a social worker who takes care of the orphans. She especially loves Amanda and would like to adopt her but does not make enough money to be allowed to do so. Amanda also especially likes her. She also wants to find love and thinks she might have a chance after meeting Roger.
 Roger Callaway (Steve Guttenberg) is a very wealthy widower. He owns Camp Callaway, which he founded with his late wife, and currently resides in a large home across the lake from it. He begins to have doubts about marrying Clarice after he meets Diane and they click.
 Mary-Kate Olsen as Amanda Lemmon
 Ashley Olsen as Alyssa Callaway
 Vincenzo (Philip Bosco) is the Callaways' butler, best friend, and right-hand man as well as a father figure to Alyssa since the day she was born.
 Clarice Kensington (Jane Sibbett) is a socialite and gold digger, the opposite of Diane. She dislikes children and baseball and only intends to marry Roger for his money. She also convinces him that Alyssa is too spoiled and gets away with bad behavior.
 Harry (Ernie Grunwald) and Fanny Butkis (Ellen-Ray Hennessy) are Amanda's potential adoptive parents. Although she wants to be adopted, she dislikes them, having heard that they "collect kids" and will "take anybody" only to make them work in their salvage yard for slave labor. They have several "adopted" kids and a biological son, Harry, Jr. (Dov Tiefenbach).

Other characters

Awards and nominations 
 Won – Kids' Choice Award for Favorite Movie Actress (Mary-Kate and Ashley Olsen)
 Nominated – Nickelodeon Blimp Award for Favorite Movie Actress (Kirstie Alley)
 Nominated – Young Artist Award for Best Performance by an Actress Under Ten (Ashley Olsen)
 Nominated – Young Artist Award for Best Performance by an Actress Under Ten (Mary-Kate Olsen)

Reception 
The film was released on November 17, 1995 in the United States and grossed $19.5 million.

The film received an 8% approval rating on review aggregator site Rotten Tomatoes, based on 24 reviews, with an average rating of 3.9/10. The site's consensus reads "Rob Base and DJ EZ Rock told us that It Takes Two to make a thing go right, but this unpleasant Olsen twins comedy proves that the opposite can also be true". At Metacritic, which assigns a weighted average score out of 100 with reviews from mainstream critics, the film received an average score of 45 based on 12 reviews, indicating "mixed or average reviews". Audiences polled by CinemaScore gave the film an average grade of "A" on an A+ to F scale.

Kevin Thomas from Los Angeles Times called the film "a predictable but fun romp". Roger Ebert called it "harmless and fitfully amusing" with "numbingly predictable" plot and praiseworthy performances and rated it two out of four stars.

The website Parent Previews graded the film an overall B as a family-friendly one with "only a couple of bad words and a bit of child intimidation from the bad guys", and Rod Gustafson from that website called it "predictable" with a "happy ending" that children can enjoy.

References

External links 

 
 
 
 

1995 films
1995 directorial debut films
1995 romantic comedy films
1990s American films
1990s female buddy films
American female buddy films
American romantic comedy films
1990s English-language films
Films about adoption
Films about children
Films about orphans
Films about summer camps
Films about weddings in the United States
Films based on Lottie and Lisa
Films directed by Andy Tennant
Rysher Entertainment films
Warner Bros. films